Baby Hamster Kidney fibroblasts (BHK cells) are an adherent cell line used in molecular biology.
The cells were derived in 1961 by I. A. Macpherson and M. G. P. Stoker. Nowadays, subclone 13 is occasionally used, which was originally derived by single-cell isolation from the kidneys of five unsexed, 1-day-old hamsters.

BHK and virus infection 
BHK-21 cells are susceptible to human adenovirus D, reovirus 3, and vesicular stomatitis virus (Indiana strain).
BHK-21 cells are resistant to poliovirus 2 and Rabbit vesivirus (RaV).
The cells are negative for reverse transcriptase, which means that they lack integral retrovirus genomes.

Utilization 
The BHK-21 cells are useful for transformations and for stable and temporary transfections. BHK cells are also used to study viral infections.

Recommended growth medium 
 High-glucose DMEM
 FBS fetal bovine serum 5% (when you freeze, add 10%)
 GLU glutamine 1%  
 PSA regular antibiotics 1% 
 Splitting :10 by Trypsin

References

External links                                                               
Cellosaurus entry for BHK-21
Cellosaurus entry for BHK-21 clone 13 (most used derivative)

Rodent cell lines
Virology